Trenko Rujanović (born c. 1870), known as Vojvoda Trenko (Војвода Тренко), was a Macedonian Serb Chetnik and Bulgarian apostate.

Life
Rujanović was born in the village of Krapa, in the Poreče region, part of the Ottoman Empire (now R. Macedonia). His father was Jovan Rujanović.

In 1895, he participated into the pro-Bulgarian Supreme Macedonian Committee chetas' action. Later he joined the Bulgarian-organized Internal Macedonian Revolutionary Organization (IMRO) and fought in the Kičevo region. In 1899/1900 he personally sought the Serbian consuls for the establishment of a Serbian revolutionary organization and Serbian armed bands. 

In 1904, he left IMRO and joined the Serbian Chetnik Organization and established one of the first Serbian bands. He participated in the battle against Stefan Dimitrov at the village of Orešje (April 1905) when the Serbian bands won the battle at Oreškim livadama against the IMRO. Also, he participated in the battle at Kurtov kamen (1907). After the Young Turk Revolution (1908), he left his weapon until further Young Turk pressing, reactivating his band in 1910.

Gallery

See also

Tasa Konević
 List of Chetnik voivodes

References

Sources

1870 births
20th-century deaths
20th-century Serbian people
Serbian rebels
Serbian military leaders
People from Makedonski Brod Municipality
Serbs of North Macedonia